Dokkaebi are legendary creatures from Korean mythology and folklore.

Dokkaebi may also refer to:

Drama
 Dokkaebi, also known as English title Guardian: The Lonely and Great God, 2016 South Korean TV series

Novel
 Dokkaebi, Korean novel series

Game
 Dokkaebi, a character that appears in the video game Tom Clancy's Rainbow Six Siege
 DokeV, a South Korean video game developed by Pearl Abyss